CFBW-FM is a community radio station broadcasting at 91.3 FM in Hanover, Ontario, Canada.

The station was originally granted a three-year developmental community radio license, and began broadcasting on December 31, 2001. It was subsequently granted a permanent license in 2005.

Presenters

Andy Mack - The Sounds of Scotland Show. (Internationally Syndicated)
Gary Smith - The Afternoon Show Monday & Wednesday,
Joel Axler - Friday Night Oldies,
Lee Evans - The Bluewater Blues Show, 
Ian Wilson - The Breakfast Show + Crooners & All That Jazz,
Chris Young - Solid Gold Country (Internationally Syndicated)
Norine SieuNarine - The World Music Show,
The Yorkshire Lass,
Roz's Rockin Country,
The Abyss with Bo Louther,
Bluewater Bluegrass with The Axeman,
Hard Rock & Blues with Bronte Billy,
The Gospel Show with John Calvert,

References

External links
Bluewater Radio CFBW 91.3 FM
 
 

Fbw
Fbw
Radio stations established in 2001
2001 establishments in Ontario